Toros del Este (formerly Azucareros del Este) are a baseball team in the Dominican Winter League established in .

See also
Toros del Este players

External links
 Official site
 Fans Site

La Romana, Dominican Republic
Baseball teams in the Dominican Republic
Baseball teams established in 1983
1983 establishments in the Dominican Republic